Acontia gratiosa is a moth of the family Noctuidae first described by Hans Daniel Johan Wallengren in 1856.

Distribution
It is found in continental Africa and Farquhar Atoll in the Seychelles.

References

External links
 Swedish Museum of Natural History - with a picture
 

gratiosa
Moths of Africa
Moths described in 1856